Good as New is a 2020 Russian comedy film directed by Evgeniy Shelyakin.

Plot 
The film tells about a man who finds himself on a beach in Thailand and does not remember anything. He only knows Russian, but despite this he manages to organize an adventurous business. Nevertheless, despite the success, he did not understand why he flew here.

Cast

References

External links 
 

2020 films
2020s Russian-language films
2020 comedy films
Russian comedy films